Maria Trovaya Pym is a fictional character appearing in American comic books published by Marvel Comics, depicted as the first wife of Hank Pym and the mother of Nadia van Dyne. After being initially held captive by the Red Room and killed, she is resurrected by A.I.M. and mutated into a being nearly identical in appearance to M.O.D.O.K. called S.O.D.A.M. (and later M.O.D.A.M.).

Publication history
Maria Trovaya Pym debuted in Tales to Astonish #44 (plotted by Stan Lee, scripted by H. E. Huntley, and drawn by Jack Kirby, June 1963) as the deceased wife of Henry "Hank" Pym whom his future partner and second wife Janet "The Wasp" van Dyne resembles. She first appeared in The West Coast Avengers vol. 2 #36 as an agent of A.I.M., created by Steve Englehart and Al Milgrom, in Solo Avengers #16 as SODAM, created by Tom DeFalco with Milgrom, and Quasar #9 as MODAM, created by Mark Gruenwald and Mike Manle. A younger Maria Trovaya appears in flashbacks throughout The Unstoppable Wasp, starring the character's daughter Nadia and created by Mark Waid and Alan Davis, in a recurring capacity.

Fictional character biography
Maria Trovaya was born the daughter of Dr. Janos Trovaya, a Hungarian geneticist and entomologist, both being political prisoners in their native Hungary before managing to escape to the United States of America, where her father started working for the United States government. Upon meeting Hank Pym, Maria fell in love with him and the pair married, returning to Maria's native Hungary for their honeymoon, describing Hank's laziness as signs of him being "not an industrious ant" and instilling him the interest in ants that ultimately leads him to become Ant-Man.

Kidnapping, pregnancy, and death
While in Hungary, Maria is kidnapped by communist agents before Hank's eyes; after reporting Maria's kidnapping to the American embassy in Hungary, Hank is informed that her corpse had been discovered, along with a note claiming that it is what happens to people who attempt to escape from behind the Iron Curtain. That same day, Hank learns Maria's father to have been killed in a laboratory explosion at the same time as Maria. Swearing revenge against anyone involved in Maria's murder, Hank goes on a rampage throughout Hungary and is imprisoned for assault, having been unable to find Maria's murderers.

On the verge of a complete mental and physical breakdown, Hank is freed by the American embassy and arranged to return to the United States. Unbeknownst to Hank, Maria remained alive as a prisoner of the Red Room before giving birth to a daughter, Nadia, who was subsequently raised to become a potential Black Widow, ultimately becoming a new Wasp upon escaping from the Red Room and travelling to America, where she is later formally adopted by Hank's ex-wife and original Wasp Janet van Dyne, whom Hank claimed to have only married following Maria's death due to her physical resemblance to her.

Resurrection and MODAM mutation
After resurrecting Maria, A.I.M. mutated her into a large-headed creature similar to MODOK before sending her to Pym at the headquarters of the West Coast Avengers. Pym took her in, seeking to cure her condition, but having been programmed as a spy, she stole files from him and returned to A.I.M.. There, she was further mutated into a being nearly identical in appearance to MODOK called SODAM (Specialized Organism Designed for Aggressive Maneuvers). In this new form, she opposed Hawkeye and Dr. Pym, who identified what was left of Maria within her as dead. Her code name was later changed to MODAM (Mental Organism Designed for Aggressive Maneuvers). Her first assignment as MODAM was acquiring Quasar's quantum bands. MODAM later appeared as one of Superia's Femizons.

Omega Red believed that MODAM was not Maria Trovaya, but Olinka Barankova, a woman who had once betrayed the mercenary. However, MODAM herself stated that "A.I.M. personnel files are routinely falsified" while revealing that she is in-fact the real Maria Trovaya. Maria subsequently disappears when A.I.M. sends her in to attempt to fix a breach in reality caused by a defective version of the Cosmic Cube, with her body chassis later being found and put on display by in HYDRA headquarters by the Red Skull.

Powers and abilities
As MODAM, Maria was empowered through artificial acceleration of her brain tissue growth by means of mutagenic chemicals and radiation, plus cybernetic implants. As a result, she possesses a superhuman intellect, and the ability to project psionic force for a number of effects, including: concussive energy, generation of heat, and protective fields. She also possesses limited telepathy and imposition of her will upon others. MODAM's headband contains equipment which aids her in the focusing of her psionic powers.

MODAM is permanently encased within an exo-skeletal shell of life-supporting machinery which augments her musculature, provides mobility, and performs various bodily functions. Sensors equipped throughout the exoskeleton monitor both her body's functions and the system's mechanical functions and transmit this data telemetrically to A.I.M. headquarters. Thus, they monitor both her blood sugar level and her rocket fuel level. MODAM is equipped with two telescoping tentacle-like arms within which her own arms fit. Each terminates in a pronged "hand". MODAM's "hover-chair" contains anti-gravity generators enabling it to hover and chemically fueled rocket boosters to propel it. MODAM's musculature is atrophied (at least proportionally) while her head has been enlarged; thus, she is physically dependent on the exoskeleton provided by her hover-chair for physical support and movement.

References

External links
 Maria Trovaya Pym at Marvel Wiki
 MODAM at Marvel Wiki
 Maria Trovaya Pym at Marvel Wiki
 MODAM at Comic Vine

Characters created by Al Milgrom
Characters created by Jack Kirby
Characters created by Mark Gruenwald
Characters created by Stan Lee
Characters created by Steve Englehart
Comics characters introduced in 1963
Comics characters introduced in 1988
Fictional characters with precognition
Fictional Hungarian people
Marvel Comics cyborgs
Marvel Comics female supervillains
Marvel Comics mutates